There are hundreds of antarctic lakes in Antarctica.
In 2018 researchers at the Alfred Wegener Institute for Polar and Marine Research published a study they claimed cast doubt on the earlier estimate that there were almost 400 subglacial antarctic lakes.  Antarctica also has some relatively small regions that are clear of ice and snow, and there are some surface lakes in these regions. They called for on the ground seismic studies, or drilling, to determine a more reliable number.

These lakes are buried beneath deep layers of glacial ice. When a glacier is very thick, the pressure at the bottom is great enough that liquid water can exist at temperatures where water would freeze, at regular pressures.

Scientists studying the lakes, by careful drilling and water sampling, suggest conditions there may resemble the oceans believed to exist on planet Jupiter's moon Europa.

Selected Antarctic lakes

References

Lakes of Antarctica